Ştefan Gheorghiu (March 23, 1926 – March 17, 2010) was a Romanian musician, violinist and teacher, born in Galați, Romania.

At 5 he starts studying the violin and at 9 becomes student of the Royal Music Academy in Bucharest. George Enescu recommended him and his brother Valentin Gheorghiu - pianist, for a scholarship at the Conservatoire de Paris, where he studied the violin with Maurice Hewitt and musical harmony and counterpoint with Noel Gallon.
During the war he continued studies in Bucharest with Garabet Avakian and Mihail Jora. Gheorghiu finished his studies in Moscow, attending the violin performing art masterclasses of David Oistrakh.

Since 1946 he was appointed concert-soloist of the State Philharmonic in Bucharest, where he performed both in symphonic concerts and in violin recitals. He was member of the Romanian Trio, together with Valentin Gheorghiu and Radu Aldulescu. At the first edition of the George Enescu International Competition in 1958, he won the first prize for the best performance of the third sonata by Enescu, together with his brother the pianist Valentin Gheorghiu. The jury consisted of Yehudi Menuhin, David Oistrakh, Henryk Szeryng, André Gertler, Nadia Boulanger and George Georgescu.

During his 40 years of concert activity, Stefan Gheorghiu played more than 2000 performances in his native country and touring in Europe, USA, Canada and Asia. Among the most important musical centers that had him as a guest were Paris, Menton, London, Manchester, Rome, Vienna, Salzburg, Locarno, Lausanne, Basel, Prague, Warsaw, Berlin, Munich, Leipzig, Moscow, Sankt Petersburg, Riga, Talin, Sofia, Athens, Thessaloniki, Montreal, San Francisco, Los Angeles, St. Louis, Boston, Peking, Shanghai. He worked together with conductors Frans Konwitschny, Constantin Silvestri, Kyrill Kondrashin, George Georgescu, Jean Périsson.

He made recordings for Electrecord (the Romanian home record), Supraphon and for other different radios across Europe. Stefan Gheorghiu made many first audition recordings of George Enescu's work: the piano quartet, the piano quintet, the chamber symphony (Grand Prix du Disque - Paris), "Impressions d'enfance", the third sonata.

His concert activity was doubled, starting with 1960 by the pedagogical one. He was a violin performing art professor at the National University of Music Bucharest. His remarkable results in developing of the young artists were awarded at many international violin competitions.

The list of his students includes:

 Cristina Anghelescu
 Cosmin Bănică
 Corina Belcea
 Bogdan Bobocea
 Constantin Bogdanas
 Delia Bugarin
 Luminița Burcă
 Liviu Câșleanu

 Clara Cernat
 Lenuța Ciulei
 Florin Croitoru
 Gabriel Croitoru
 Angèle Dubeau
 Christophe Giovaninetti
 Ladislaw Horvath
 Radu Ianai
 Gabriela Ijac
 Rodica Iosub
 Florin Ionescu-Galați
 Silvia Marcovici
 Mihaela Martin
 Vlad Mendelsohn
 Irina Mureșan
 Adriana Nedriță
 Anca Rațiu
 Adrian Nemțeanu
 Vladimir Nemțeanu
 Marius Nichițeanu
 Adelina Oprean
 Ruxandra Petcu-Colan
 Stephan Picard
 Ștefan Rodescu
 Andrei Roșianu
 Constantin Șerban
 Magdalena Sârbu
 Mariana Sârbu
 Carol Stettner
 Sergiu Swartz
 Alexandru Tomescu
 Dan Claudiu Vornicelu
 Lucian Moraru

External links
/https://www.conservatoiredeparis.fr/fr/medias/video/cours-public-de-violon-par-stefan-gheorghiu

References

Romanian classical violinists
Male classical violinists
1926 births
2010 deaths
20th-century classical violinists
20th-century male musicians